Sherman A. Jackson, also known as Abdul Hakim Jackson (born 1956) is an American scholar of Islam.

Career
Jackson is the King Faisal Chair of Islamic Thought and Culture and Professor of Religion and American Studies and Ethnicity at the University of Southern California. Jackson was formerly the Arthur F. Thurnau Professor of Near Eastern Studies, visiting professor of law and professor of Afro-American Studies at the University of Michigan.

Jackson received his Ph.D. from the University of Pennsylvania and has taught at the University of Texas at Austin, Indiana University, Wayne State University and the University of Michigan.  From 1987 to  1989, he served as executive director of the Center of Arabic Study Abroad in Cairo, Egypt. He is author of several books, including Islamic Law and the State: The Constitutional Jurisprudence of Shihâb al-Dîn al-Qarâfî (E.J.  Brill, 1996), On the Boundaries of Theological Tolerance in Islam: Abû Hâmid al-Ghazâlî's Faysal al-Tafriqa (Oxford, 2002), Islam and the Blackamerican: Looking Towards the Third Resurrection (Oxford, 2005) and Islam and the Problem of Black Suffering (Oxford, 2009).

Jackson has been featured on the Washington Post-Newsweek blog, "On Faith," as well as the Huffington Post. In 2009 and 2012,

Works
 
 On the Boundaries of Theological Tolerance in Islam: Abû Hâmid al-Ghazâlî’s Faysal al-Tafriqa, Oxford University Press, 2002, 
 

Sufism for Non-Sufis? Ibn Ata' Allah's Tâj al-'Arûs. Oxford University Press. 2012. . 
Initiative to Stop the Violence: Sadat's Assassins and the Renunciation of Political Violence. Yale University Press. 2015. .

References

External links

 Dr. Abdal Hakim Jackson (Sherman Jackson) Audio and Video Lectures

21st-century Muslim scholars of Islam
University of Michigan faculty
Living people
African-American Muslims
University of Texas at Austin faculty
Indiana University faculty
Wayne State University faculty
University of Pennsylvania alumni
1956 births
American Islamic studies scholars
Muslim scholars of Islamic studies